Mattia Eugio Rolando (born 5 November 1992) is an Italian footballer who plays as a midfielder for  club Monopoli.

Club career
Rolando made his professional, Serie C debut in the Gozzano in the first round of 2018–19 Serie C, on 17 September 2018 against Virtus Entella, playing 90 minutes. He signed to Arezzo in January 2019.

On 31 January 2020, he moved to Pro Vercelli.

On 25 June 2022, Rolando signed a two-year contract with Monopoli.

References

External links
 
 

1992 births
Living people
People from Cuorgnè
Footballers from Piedmont
Italian footballers
Association football midfielders
Serie C players
Serie D players
U.S.D. Lavagnese 1919 players
U.S.D. Novese players
U.S. Gavorrano players
S.C. Vallée d'Aoste players
Asti Calcio F.C. players
S.S.D. Varese Calcio players
S.C. Caronnese S.S.D. players
A.C. Gozzano players
S.S. Arezzo players
F.C. Pro Vercelli 1892 players
S.S. Monopoli 1966 players
Sportspeople from the Metropolitan City of Turin